Leandro Augusto Oldoni Stachelski (born 18 August 1977), known simply as Leandro Augusto, is a former professional footballer. Born in Brazil, he represented the Mexico national team.

Coaching and management
Augusto retired at the end of 2014, but already from May 2014, he became a part of the first team staff, working as an assistant manager which he did until the summer 2018. He was then appointed as sporting director. He left the position on 3 May 2019.

Career statistics
As of 1 April 2009.

Honours

UNAM
 Mexican Primera División: Clausura 2004, Apertura 2004, Clausura 2009, Clausura 2011
 Trofeo Santiago Bernabéu: 2004

Tijuana
 Liga MX: Apertura 2012

Individual
 Mexican Primera División Best Defensive Midfielder: Apertura 2007

References

External links
 
 CBF 
 

1977 births
Living people
People from Cascavel
Brazilian emigrants to Mexico
Brazilian people of Polish descent
Naturalized citizens of Mexico
Mexican people of Polish descent
Association football midfielders
Mexican footballers
Mexico international footballers
Criciúma Esporte Clube players
Sport Club Internacional players
Botafogo de Futebol e Regatas players
Club León footballers
Club Universidad Nacional footballers
Club Tijuana footballers
Club Puebla players
Liga MX players
Expatriate footballers in Mexico